The Case Western Reserve Journal of International Law is a legal journal produced by student editors at Case Western Reserve University School of Law in Cleveland, Ohio. It was established in 1968, and published three times per year by student editors until 2015, when the journal became annual. The journal includes symposia-based, scholarly articles and transcripts of speeches that address topics of international legal significance.

In collaboration with the Frederick K. Cox International Law Center, JIL sponsors legal symposia on broad topics, drawing noteworthy experts from around the world to Cleveland, Ohio. Past events focused on subjects such as the lessons of the trial of Saddam Hussein, bioterrorism, and torture and the War on Terror.

References

American law journals
Case Western Reserve University
International law journals
Annual journals
Law journals edited by students
Publications established in 1968